Kopai may refer to:
Kopai River, in India
Kopai (Boeotia), a city of ancient Boeotia, Greece

See also
Kopais